Mohsen Labidi (born 15 January 1954), also known as Mohsen Jendoubi, is a Tunisian football defender who played for Tunisia in the 1978 FIFA World Cup. He also played for Stade Tunisien and Al-Ahli.

References

External links
 
 

1954 births
Living people
Association football defenders
Tunisian footballers
Tunisia international footballers
1978 FIFA World Cup players
1978 African Cup of Nations players
Competitors at the 1975 Mediterranean Games
Mediterranean Games bronze medalists for Tunisia
Mediterranean Games medalists in football
Tunisian Ligue Professionnelle 1 players
Saudi Professional League players
Stade Tunisien players
Al-Ahli Saudi FC players
Expatriate footballers in Saudi Arabia
Tunisian expatriate sportspeople in Saudi Arabia